Simpsonichthys suzarti is a species of killifish from the family Rivulidae.
It is found in the Rio Pardo floodplains in the northeastern part of Brazil in South America.

References

suzarti
Taxa named by Wilson José Eduardo Moreira da Costa
Fish described in 2003